Martine Wolff (born 20 June 1996) is a Norwegian female handball player who plays for Sola HK.

Achievements
Norwegian League
 Bronze Medalist: 2020/2021, 2021/2022
Norwegian Cup
 Silver: 2020, 2022/2023

References 
 

Norwegian female handball players
1996 births
Living people   
Handball players from Oslo